The five-year survival rate is a type of survival rate for estimating the prognosis of a particular disease, normally calculated from the point of diagnosis.  Lead time bias from earlier diagnosis can affect interpretation of the five-year survival rate.

There are absolute and relative survival rates, but the latter are more useful and commonly used.

Relative and absolute rates
Five-year relative survival rates are more commonly cited in cancer statistics. Five-year absolute survival rates may sometimes also be cited.

 Five-year absolute survival rates describe the percentage of patients alive five years after the disease is diagnosed.
 Five-year relative survival rates describe the percentage of patients with a disease alive five years after the disease is diagnosed, divided by the percentage of the general population of corresponding sex and age alive after five years. Typically, cancer five-year relative survival rates are well below 100%, reflecting excess mortality among cancer patients compared to the general population. In contrast to five-year absolute survival rates, five-year relative survival rates may also equal or even exceed 100% if cancer patients have the same or even higher survival rates than the general population. The pattern may occur if cancer patients can generally be cured, or patients diagnosed with cancer have greater socioeconomic wealth or access to medical care than the general population. 
The fact that relative survival rates above 100% were estimated for some groups of patients appears counterintuitive on first view. It is unlikely that occurrence of prostate cancer would increase chances of survival, compared to the general population. A more plausible explanation is that the pattern reflects a selection effect of PSA screening, as screening tests tend to be used less often by socially disadvantaged population groups, who, in general, also have higher mortality.

Uses
Five-year survival rates can be used to compare the effectiveness of treatments. Use of five-year survival statistics is more useful in aggressive diseases that have a shorter life expectancy following diagnosis, such as lung cancer, and less useful in cases with a long life expectancy, such as prostate cancer.

Improvements in rates are sometimes attributed to improvements in diagnosis rather than to improvements in prognosis.

To compare treatments independently from diagnostics, it may be better to consider survival from reaching a certain stage of the disease or its treatment.

Analysis performed against the Surveillance, Epidemiology, and End Results database (SEER) facilitates calculation of five-year survival rates.

References

Medical terminology
Epidemiology